Lily, aime-moi is a 1975 French comedy film directed by Maurice Dugowson. It was entered into the 25th Berlin International Film Festival.

Cast
 Jean-Michel Folon - François
 Patrick Dewaere - Gaston, dit Johnny Cash
 Rufus - Claude
 Zouzou - Lily
 Juliette Gréco - Flo
 Jean-Pierre Bisson - Le frère de Flo / Flo's brother
 Roger Blin - Le père de Lily / Lily's father
 Jean Capel
  - L'intellectuel de chez Flo / Intellectual at Flo's
 Pauline Godefroy - Une invitée chez Flo
 Anne Jousset - L'auto-stoppeuse / Hitchhiker
 Tatiana Moukhine - La mère de Lily / Lily's mother
 Maurice Vallier - Le rédacteur chez François / François' coworker
 Andréas Voutsinas - Le barbu de chez Flo / Bearded man at Flo's
 Henry Jaglom - Un invité chez Flo / A guest at Flo's
 Bernard Freyd
 Miou-Miou - La fille dans le café / The girl in the coffee-shop

References

External links

1975 films
French comedy films
1970s French-language films
1975 comedy films
Films directed by Maurice Dugowson
Films produced by Michel Seydoux
1970s French films